The Lienchiang County Government is the local government of the Republic of China that governs Lienchiang County.

Organizational structures

Internal units and agencies
 Accounting and statistics Department
 Civil Affairs Department
 Civil Service Ethics Department
 Cultural Affairs Department
 Economic Development Department
 Education Department
 Finance Department
 General Affairs Department
 Personnel Department
 Public Works Department

External units and agencies
 Environmental Protection Bureau
 Finance and Local Tax Bureau
 Fire Bureau
 Land Administration Bureau
 Police Bureau
 Public Health Bureau
 Traffic and Tourism Bureau

See also
 Lienchiang County Council

References

External links

 

Matsu Islands
Local governments of the Republic of China